PhyreEngine is a license-only free to use game engine from Sony Interactive Entertainment, compatible with 
PlayStation 5, PlayStation 4, PlayStation 3, PlayStation VR, PlayStation Vita, PlayStation Portable, Nintendo Switch, Microsoft Windows (for OpenGL and DirectX 11), Google Android and Apple iOS. PhyreEngine has been adopted by several game studios and has been used in over 200 published titles.

Features
PhyreEngine is exclusively distributed to Sony licensees as an installable package that includes both full source code and Microsoft Windows tools, provided under its own flexible use license that allows any PlayStation 3 game developer, publisher or tools and middleware company to create software based partly or fully on PhyreEngine on any platform. The engine uses sophisticated parallel processing techniques that are optimized for the Synergistic Processor Unit (SPU) of the Cell Broadband Engine of PS3, but can be easily ported to other multi-core architectures.

PhyreEngine supports OpenGL and Direct3D, in addition to the low level PS3 LibGCM library. It provides fully functional “game templates” as source code, including support for Havok Complete XS, NVIDIA PhysX and Bullet for physics.

History
The development of PhyreEngine was started in 2003 to create a graphics engine for PlayStation 3. The first public demonstration occurred in 2006.

PhyreEngine was launched during the 2008 Game Developers Conference. New features (including deferred rendering) were showcased during GDC 2009. Version 2.40, released in March 2009, included a new “foliage rendering” system that provides tools and technology to render ultra-realistic trees and plants to be easily integrated into games.

Version 3.0, released in 2011, has a new and powerful asset pipeline, combining enhanced versions of the already robust exporters, with a powerful processing tool to generate optimized assets for each platform. Also new is the rewritten level editor, which permits a far more data-driven approach to authoring games using PhyreEngine. Version 3.0 added support for the PlayStation Vita.

Derived game engines
 EGO
 Silk Engine

Notes

References

External links
 

2008 software
Freeware game engines
PlayStation 3
PlayStation 3 games
Cell BE architecture